Momo may refer to:

Geography
 Momo (department), a division of Northwest Province in Cameroon
 Momo, Gabon, a town in the Woleu-Ntem province of Gabon
 Momo, Piedmont, a town in the province of Novara, in northern Italy
 Joffrey Tower, in Chicago, Illinois, US, originally named the "Modern Momentum Building"

People

Musicians
 Momo Hirai (born 1996), Japanese singer, dancer, rapper and member of K-pop girl group Twice
 Momo Latiff, also known as "Momo", Malaysian singer of the 1950s
 , Japanese classical pianist (born 1972)
 Hitomi Momoi (born 1974), J-pop singer who is a former member of "I've Sound" and a member of Por
 Momoko Tsugunaga (born 1992), J-pop singer and idol, member of group Berryz Koubou

Other people
 Momo (artist), American street artist
 Momo (Tonga), the 10th ruler of the Tui Tonga dynasty (south Pacific islands)
 Momo Adamo (1895–1956), Italian-American mobster
 Jerónimo Figueroa Cabrera (born 1982), Spanish footballer
 Sam Giancana (1908–1975), American mobster nicknamed "Momo"
 Mohamed Sissoko (born 1985), former Malian international and FC Sochaux-Montbéliard football player
 , Japanese judoka
 Uroš Momić (born 1992), Serbian footballer known as Momo

Fiction
 Momo (novel) (alternatively The Grey Gentlemen), a 1973 novel by Michael Ende
 Momo (1986 film), a 1986 film based on Ende's novel
 Momo (2001 film) (Momo alla conquista del tempo), an animated Italian film by Enzo D'Alò based on Ende's novel
 Momo (TV series), a 2003 German animated TV series based on Ende's novel
 Momo and the Time Thieves, a 2017 opera in two acts by Svitlana Azarova based on Ende's novel

Characters
 Momo (Avatar: The Last Airbender), from the animated television series Avatar: The Last Airbender
 Momo (Breath of Fire character), from the video game series Breath of Fire
 MOMO (Xenosaga), from the video game Xenosaga
 King Momo (Carnival character), portrayed in numerous Latin American festivities
 Momo the Monster, a legend originating in Missouri, in the United States
 Momo Belia Deviluke, from the manga To Love Ru
 Momo Chiyoda, a main character in the manga The Demon Girl Next Door
 Momo Hinamori, in the manga Bleach
 Momo Karuizawa, in the video game Project Justice, by Capcom
 Momo Sakura, a minor character in the anime Puella Magi Madoka Magica
 Momo Sohma, from the manga Fruits Basket
 Momo Yaoyorozu, from the manga My Hero Academia
 Momo, narrator-protagonist of the novel The Life Before Us (La Vie devant soi), by Romain Gary (as Émile Ajar), and the novel's UK title
 Momo, the heroines of Magical Princess Minky Momo, two different magical-girl anime
 MOMO, a main character from the film Madame Rosa, directed by Moshé Mizrahi
 Momo, the main character of the 1973 novel  of the same name
 Momo, a main character from the 2003 film Monsieur Ibrahim, directed by François Dupeyron
 Momo, Fuu's pet Japanese dwarf flying squirrel, in the anime series Samurai Champloo
 Momo, the female protagonist of Wonder Momo, a Japan-only 1987 arcade game
 Momo, a black cat from the 2016 Google Doodle browser game Magic Cat Academy
 Momo Adachi, a main character in the manga series Peach Girl (ピーチガール)
 Momo Belia Deviluke, Lala's younger sister, in the manga and anime series To Love-Ru
 Momo Kisaragi, a character of mixed media series Kagerou Project
 Momo Kuzuryū, from Valkyrie Drive- Bhikkhuni
 Momo Maruo, from the Chouriki Sentai Ohranger
 Takeshi Gouda, nicknamed "Momo", a main character in the manga Tramps Like Us (きみはペット)
, a character in the manga and anime series Boku no Hero Academia

Science and technology

Biology and medicine
 Monochorionic-monoamniotic, presentation of identical twins
 MOMO syndrome, a rare genetic disorder

Computing
 Momo (software), a Chinese location-based services instant messaging application
 MoMo, abbreviation of Mozilla Messaging

Other technologies
 MOS-1 (satellite), also known as Momo-1, Japan's first Earth observation satellite
 Momo (rocket), a sounding rocket manufactured by Japanese company Interstellar Technologies

Transportation

Ships
 , a class of destroyer built for the Imperial Japanese Navy
 , the name of more than one Imperial Japanese Navy destroyer
 , a United States Navy patrol boat in commission from 1917 to 1919

Other transportation
 Momo (company), manufacturer of automotive and racing gear
 Momo Car-Sharing, short for the EU project "more options for energy efficient mobility through Car-Sharing"
 Siemens Modular Metro, a brand of electric train vehicle system

Other uses
 Momo (food), a dumpling popular in Tibet, Nepal, Bhutan, and parts of India
 Momo Challenge hoax, an urban legend and hoax about a fictitious Internet phenomenon
 MoMo, an abbreviation for Molly Mormon, a stereotype
 Mystery Of Missing Out, a variant of fear of missing out

See also
 Momus or Momos, a Greek god

Japanese feminine given names